The 30th Lambda Literary Awards were held on June 4, 2018, to honour works of LGBT literature published in 2017. The list of nominees was released on March 6.

Special awards

Nominees and winners

References

Lambda
2018 in LGBT history
June 2018 events in the United States
Lambda Literary Awards
Lambda
Lambda
Lists of LGBT-related award winners and nominees